The paraquat murders were a series of indiscriminate poisonings carried out in Japan in 1985. Police were unable to gather any evidence about the murders, and the case remains unsolved. All the beverages were poisoned with the herbicide paraquat except for one which was poisoned with diquat, placed in or near the vending machine, where the victim would consume the beverage.

Events
According to The New York Times, the first victim was 52 year old Harry Otsu. On April 30, 1985, in Fukuyama, Hiroshima Harry stopped by a vending machine on his way to go fishing, purchasing two bottles of Oronamin C. Halfway through his second bottle Harry began to feel sick, and was taken to a hospital in Tondabayashi, where he died the next night. Thirty-five poisonings followed Harry's, with eleven of them resulting in death between April 30th and November 17th. 

The poisonings were centred in Western Japan, specifically Tokyo, with Oronamin C as the primary drink target. As mentioned in Jeffrey Nadrich's article, the Oronamin C drink company had a buy one-get one free promotion at the time of the crimes. Taking advantage of this, the criminal laced Ornamin C bottles with paraquat and placed them in and on top of vending machines to make customers think believe they got the promotion. The murders stopped after warnings were posted on vending machines by both vending machine operators and drink companies. 

The murderer was never caught, and remains at large to this day. It was established that at least one other unknown person attempted to imitate the murders by putting lime sulfur into drinks in Tokyo. There were also a small number of people who attempted to poison themselves in a method imitating the murders.

Response

Police
In response to the crimes, throughout Tokyo police distributed leaflets with warnings to check vending machine slots before purchases, and check bottle caps before opening drinks. While the police had no leads, it was believed that the crimes were organized and executed by a single person. The police also noted how the crimes had no targeted or consistent victims, making it impossible to establish a motive.

Company
In the midst of the poisonings, the Japanese Soft Drink Bottlers Association spokesman Takeo Mizzuchi shifted blame onto victims. He expressed how customers should notice broken seals stating that 'if only consumers were more cautious, they would have seen that some tampering had been done."  Despite his statement, Mizuuchi issued 1.3 million warning stickers to be placed on vending machines across Tokyo. Additionally, vending machine operators posted their own warnings, advising against taking abandoned drinks found in or around the machines.

Experts
The Chicago Tribune reported that experts in various fields at the time of the crimes speculated the crimes to be a manifestation of Japan's orderly, intense, and work-oriented society. Hirkoaki Iwao, a Tokyo professor of criminal sociology said: "It is not uncommon for Japanese who live under tremendous pressure, both on the job and in overcrowded communities, to let out their frustrations by hurting someone else," insinuating the crimes to be an outlet for relief for the criminal. Additionally, Susumu Oda, a mental health specialist at the University of Tsukuba suggested the crimes to be motivated by adrenaline rushes, and sense of superiority in imagining victims 
struggling.

References

1985 murders in Japan
Deaths by poisoning
Fugitives
Serial murders in Japan
Unidentified serial killers